Feroz Khan or Feroze Khan may refer to:

 Feroz Khan (actor) (1939–2009), Indian actor and film director
 Feroz Khan Noon (1893–1970), Pakistani politician and 8th Prime Minister of Pakistan
 Feroze Khan (born 1990), Pakistani VJ, television actor, and model
 Feroze Khan (field hockey) (1904–2005), Pakistani hockey player, and Olympic gold medalist
 Feroz Abbas Khan (born 1959), Indian theatre and film director
 Farooq Feroze Khan (1939–2021), Chairman joint chiefs and the Pakistan Air Force general